Lom Sak is a district (amphoe) in the northern part of Phetchabun province, northern Thailand.

History

The history of Lom Sak area dates back to the founding of the Sukhothai Kingdom in the 13th century. The governor of Mueang Rat (Lom Sak), Pho Khun Pha Mueang (พ่อขุนผาเมือง), was one of the Thai warlords who defeated the Khmer. When Pho Khun Bang Klang Hao (พ่อขุนบางกลางหาว) and a friend established the Sukhothai Kingdom, he supported his friend to be the first king because his wife was Khmer.

In 1767 in the reign of King Taksin the Great, Phraya Chakri (the later King Rama I) returned from an expedition to Vientiane through the area of present-day Lom Kao district. Some of the people from Vientiane settled there. When the new town grew bigger, they moved their town to the plain near the Pa Sak River and named the new town Lom Sak. Later other Lao from Vientiane, who was forced by King Taksin to settle in Lopburi, returned and settled in Lom Sak.

According to the historian Prince Damrong Rajanubhab, Mueang Lom Sak was established in the reign of King Nangklao (Rama III). When King Chulalongkorn (Rama V) created the monthon as part of the Thesaphiban administrative reforms, Mueang Lom Sak was controlled by Monthon Phetchabun. Later it was downgraded to be a district of Phetchabun Province. In 1916 the district was named Wat Pa (วัดป่า). The name of the district was changed back to Lom Sak on 11 November 1938.

From 1970 to 1980 the hills of Lom Sak were a stronghold of the Communist Party of Thailand.

Geography
Neighboring districts are (from the north clockwise) Lom Kao and Nam Nao of Phetchabun Province, Khon San of Chaiyaphum province, and Mueang Phetchabun and Khao Kho of Phetchabun.

Nam Nao National Park protects some of the hills of the district. Khao Kho National Park is currently being developed and will also occupy parts of the district.

Climate

Administration
The district is divided into 23 sub-districts (tambons), which are further subdivided into 251 villages (mubans). Lom Sak itself is a town (thesaban mueang) which covers tambon Lom Sak. There are a further 20 tambon administrative organizations (TAO).

References

Districts of Phetchabun province
Former provinces of Thailand